Thomas Christopher Collins (born January 16, 1947) is a Canadian cardinal of the Catholic Church. He was the Metropolitan Archbishop of Toronto from 2007 to 2023, the Bishop of Saint Paul in Alberta from 1997 to 1999, and Archbishop of Edmonton from 1999 to 2006. He was elevated to the rank of Cardinal by Pope Benedict XVI on February 18, 2012.

Early life and education
Collins was born in Guelph, Ontario, the son of George Collins, circulation manager of The Guelph Mercury, and his wife, Juliana ( Keen), a legal secretary. He has two older sisters. As a child, he was an altar server at the Our Lady Immaculate Church. He attended St. Stanislaw's Elementary School and Bishop Macdonell High School, where he was inspired by one of his English teachers to join the priesthood.

After earning a Bachelor of Arts degree in English from St. Jerome College, Waterloo in 1969, Collins was ordained to the diaconate on May 14, 1972. In 1973, he received a Master of Arts in English from the University of Western Ontario and a Bachelor of Theology degree from St. Peter's Seminary, London.

Priesthood
Collins was ordained a priest for the Diocese of Hamilton, Ontario, by Bishop Paul Reding on May 5, 1973. He then served as associate pastor at Holy Rosary Parish in Burlington and at Christ the King Cathedral, as well as an English teacher and chaplain at Cathedral Boys' High School. He furthered his studies in Rome, specializing in sacred scripture at the Pontifical Biblical Institute, from which he obtained a Licentiate in Sacred Scripture in 1978.

Upon his return to Ontario in 1978, Collins served as a lecturer in English at King's College and in Scripture at St. Peter's Seminary, where he later became spiritual director (1981) and associate professor of Scripture (1985). Returning to Rome, he completed a Doctorate in Sacred Theology from the Pontifical Gregorian University in 1986. His doctoral dissertation was entitled: "Apocalypse 22:6–21 as the Focal Point of Moral Teaching and Exhortation in the Apocalypse."

After becoming associate editor of Discover the Bible in 1989, Collins returned to St. Peter's Seminary as Dean of Theology and vice-rector in 1992. He later served as rector of St. Peter's from 1995 to 1997.

Episcopal ministry

Diocese of Saint Paul, Alberta
On March 25, 1997, Collins was appointed Coadjutor Bishop of Saint Paul in Alberta by Pope John Paul II. He received his episcopal consecration on the following May 14, from Bishop Anthony Tonnos, with Bishops Raymond Roy and John Sherlock serving as co-consecrators, at the Cathedral of Christ the King in Hamilton, Ontario. He selected as his episcopal motto: "Deum Adora", meaning, "Worship God".

Collins succeeded Bishop Roy as the fifth Bishop of Saint Paul in Alberta upon the latter's retirement on June 30, 1997. He became a member of the National Commission of Theology of the Canadian Conference of Catholic Bishops (CCCB) that same year.

Archdiocese of Edmonton
Collins was promoted to Coadjutor Archbishop of Edmonton on February 18, 1999, and later succeeded Archbishop Joseph MacNeil as the sixth Archbishop of Edmonton on the following June 7. He served as president of the Conference of Bishops of Alberta.

In Edmonton Collins initiated monthly lectio divina sessions at St. Joseph's Cathedral Basilica. He also established St. Benedict's Chapel in a vacant store in Edmonton's City Centre Mall for ministry to downtown shoppers and office workers.

Within the CCCB, he served as Chairman of the National Commission of Theology (1999–2001) and Chairman of the National Commission on Christian Unity (2001–2003). He was also a member of the organizing committee for World Youth Day 2002, which was held in Toronto. From 1999 to 2007, he was President of the Alberta Conference of Catholic Bishops. In addition to his duties as ordinary of the Edmonton Archdiocese, he was Apostolic Administrator of Saint Paul in Alberta from March 16 to September 8, 2001.

Archbishop of Toronto
Collins was named the tenth Archbishop of Toronto by Pope Benedict XVI on December 16, 2006. He succeeded Aloysius Ambrozic there and was installed at St. Michael's Cathedral on January 30, 2007. He served as Chancellor of the University of St. Michael's College and the Pontifical Institute of Mediaeval Studies in Toronto. He is heavily involved in the pro-life movement. Collins was elected president of the Ontario Conference of Catholic Bishops in 2008. Collins was the apostolic visitor to the Archdiocese of Cashel in Ireland following the publication of the Ryan and Murphy Reports in 2009.

Collins is a member of the Pontifical Council for Social Communications. He has also served as the Delegate of the Congregation of the Doctrine of the Faith for Anglicanorum Coetibus (providing for personal ordinariates for Anglicans entering into full communion with the Catholic Church).

On February 18, 2012, he was created Cardinal-Priest of San Patrizio. In addition to his other duties in the Roman Curia, Collins was appointed a member of the Congregation for Catholic Education.

He was one of the cardinal electors who participated in the 2013 papal conclave that elected Pope Francis.

On February 11, 2023, Pope Francis accepted his resignation as archbishop of Toronto. Collins remains a cardinal and eligible to vote in a papal conclave until the age of 80.

Honours

Scholastic

 Chancellor, visitor, governor, rector and fellowships

Honorary degrees

See also
Archbishop of Toronto
Roman Catholic Archdiocese of Toronto
Apostolic visitation to Ireland

Notes

References

External links

1947 births
Roman Catholic archbishops of Toronto
Canadian anti-abortion activists
Living people
People from Guelph
Roman Catholic archbishops of Edmonton
Pontifical Gregorian University alumni
University of Western Ontario alumni
University of Waterloo alumni
Members of the Pontifical Council for Social Communications
Members of the Congregation for Catholic Education
Cardinals created by Pope Benedict XVI
Canadian cardinals
21st-century Roman Catholic archbishops in Canada
Pontifical Biblical Institute alumni
St. Peter's Seminary (Diocese of London, Ontario) alumni
Members of the Order of the Holy Sepulchre
Canadian Roman Catholic archbishops